Eilean Glas means Green Island in Gaelic.

There are many islands in Scotland called Eilean Glas. They include:

Eilean Glas, Scalpay in the Outer Hebrides.
Eilean Glas within Loch Crinan
Eilean Glas within Loch Dunvegan
Eilean Glas within Loch Fyne
Eilean Glas within Loch Scavaig

There are also a number of islands named 'Glas Eilean' such as:
 Glas Eilean in Loch Alsh
 Glas Eilean within Loch Sunart (outer)
 Glas Eilean within Loch Sunart (inner)

Scottish Island set index articles